3-hydroxy-3-methylglutaryl-CoA synthase 2 (mitochondrial) is an enzyme in humans that is encoded by the HMGCS2 gene.

The protein encoded by this gene belongs to the HMG-CoA synthase family. It is a mitochondrial enzyme that catalyzes the second and rate-limiting reaction of ketogenesis, a metabolic pathway that provides lipid-derived energy for various organs during times of carbohydrate deprivation, such as fasting, by addition of a third acetyl group to acetoacetyl-CoA, producing HMG-CoA. Mutations in this gene are associated with HMG-CoA synthase deficiency (also known as HMGCS2D), affecting ketone body synthesis.

Alternatively spliced transcript variants encoding different isoforms have been found for this gene.

Occurrence 
HMGCS2 is not found in cetaceans, elephantids, or Old World fruit bats.

References

External links 
 

EC 2.3.3
Human proteins